Mount Hood is a  mountain summit located in the Opal Range of the Canadian Rockies of Alberta, Canada.

History
The mountain was named in honor of Rear Admiral Horace Hood who participated in the Battle of Jutland and went down with 

The mountain's name was made official in 1922 by the Geographical Names Board of Canada.

The first ascent of the peak was made in 1953 by J. Dodds, W. Lemmon, and party.

References

Two-thousanders of Alberta
Canadian Rockies
Alberta's Rockies